The Charlotte Hounds were a Major League Lacrosse (MLL) field lacrosse franchise that began play in the 2012 MLL season and ceased operations after the 2018 season. The team played their home games at American Legion Memorial Stadium.

Franchise history
In January 2011 the MLL voted to grant expansion teams to Charlotte and Columbus, Ohio for the 2012 MLL Season.   The team's first hire was Wade Leaphart, who was instrumental in establishing the team's identity, sales, marketing and operations, among other things. McPhilliamy and Leaphart launched a Name the Team Campaign, sponsored by OrthoCarolina, the official team physician of the Hounds, and was heavily run via social media – Facebook. First, fans pitched in ideas for the team name and location identity (Charlotte, Carolina, Queen City, etc.) Then, fans voted on the location ID, choosing Charlotte easily over Carolina.  The next stage was mostly on the team staff, in choosing 6 finalists for team names and logo prototypes.  Fans then voted on those, narrowing it down to the final three, Hounds, Legion, and Monarchs.  A final vote was held, and Hounds won by a mere 21 votes over the Legion. On June 21, 2011, the team name was announced to be the Charlotte Hounds and their colors to be royal and tan. On September 29, 2011, the team announced the hiring of head coach Mike Cerino. On February 10, 2012, the team announced the hiring of assistant coaches J.B. Clarke, Chris Phenicie, and Brad Touma.

The Hounds announced on February 7, 2012, that they had signed a landmark deal with WMYT (MyTV12) Charlotte to broadcast 7 of the 14 scheduled games.  The TV broadcasts will alternate with the Radio games on WFNZ, with the exception of the home opener and season finale, which will be covered by both stations.  WFNZ will air all home games, while WMYT will broadcast the away games as well as the home opener and season finale.  The local TV deal with WMYT is the first of its kind in major league lacrosse, as WMYT will be the only local broadcast station in the nation to offer Major League Lacrosse Broadcasts.

On May 12, 2012, the Charlotte Hounds beat the Ohio Machine 18–15 at American Legion Memorial Stadium to earn their first win in franchise history.

2013: Quick start
On August 3, 2013, the Charlotte Hounds clinched a playoff spot in just their second season after defeating the Hamilton Nationals, 14–11. On August 24 in the semifinals, Charlotte defeated top seed Denver, 17–14 for their first playoff win and championship berth in team history. Before that, the Denver Outlaws were the first team in league history to complete a perfect 14–0 regular season. On August 25, the Hounds took on the Chesapeake Bayhawks in the Steinfeld Cup. The Hounds lost 10–9 to the Bayhawks, who won their league-record fifth championship.

2014-15: Team struggles
The Hounds struggled out of the gate in 2014 starting 1–4. But on June 7, the Hounds defeated the Outlaws again, 18–15 at home. The loss for Denver snapped a 25 regular-season-game win streak for the Outlaws. Charlotte would finish 4–10 in 2014 for the worst record in the team's three-year history. Things did not get better in 2015; the Hounds actually posted a worse record: 3-11, the worst record in 2015.

Road to recovery
Before the 2016 season, the Hounds announced head coach Mike Cerino would move to general manager, a role held by Leaphart since 2012. Jim Stagnitta was hired as the team's new head coach. They started the year out with three straight home games against the Boston Cannons, Rochester Rattlers, and Florida Launch. As a result, the team got off to a 3–0 start for the first time in franchise history.

On August 6, the Hounds came back from an 11–6 deficit to defeat the Chesapeake Bayhawks, 15–13 to clinch not only their second playoff berth in franchise history, but their first winning record in franchise history at 8–6. On August 13 in Minnesota, the Hounds' season would be ended after a 16–10 loss to the top-seeded Ohio Machine.

In 2017, things would hit a speed bump. The Hounds would get off to an 0–3 start thanks to two meetings with the defending champion Outlaws. Despite being able to win five of their next eight and put themselves in the top four in the league, the Hounds were not able to finish the season strong. Charlotte posted a 6–8 record in their 2017 campaign, finishing in seventh place. One highlight from the year including drafting of Maryland attackman Matt Rambo, who led the Terrapins to their first NCAA championship since 1975 and won the 2017 Tewaaraton Award.

The Hounds began the 2018 campaign at home against the Boston Cannons. Charlotte scored 16 of the first 17 goals, setting many team records in a 25–7 win including most goals in a game, largest margin of victory, and tied the team record for fewest goals allowed in a game. Head coach Jim Stagnitta became the team's all-time leading wins leader on June 9 with a 19–13 victory over Atlanta.

Despite the hot start, Charlotte would fizzle down the stretch. Charlotte played their last "home game" on June 30 against the Atlanta Blaze at MUSC Health Stadium in Charleston, South Carolina, also the site of the year's championship game. They lost the game, 16–10. Charlotte played the Cannons in their last game of the season and lost, 14–7, a point differential of 25 goals compared to Week 1's 25–7 thumping. The Hounds were eliminated that week from postseason contention.

Season-by-season

Roster

 Regular season 25-player protected roster updated 2018-07-16

Head Coaching History

Award Winners

Coach of the Year
Jim Stagnitta: 2016

Rookie of the Year
 Joey Sankey: 2015

Most Improved Player
 Mike Chanenchuk: 2016

Draft history

First round selections

 2013: Tucker Durkin, Johns Hopkins (3rd overall); Mike Sawyer, Loyola (8th overall)
 2014: Michael Ehrhardt, Maryland (7th overall)
 2015: Will Haus, Duke (3rd overall)
 2016: Dylan Donahue, Syracuse (2nd overall), Ryan Brown, Johns Hopkins (4th overall)
 2017: Matt Rambo, Maryland (3rd overall)
 2018: Connor Fields, Albany (3rd overall)

References

External links
Official site

Charlotte Hounds
Hounds
Lacrosse clubs established in 2011
Lacrosse teams in North Carolina
2011 establishments in North Carolina
Sports teams in Charlotte, North Carolina
Lacrosse clubs disestablished in 2019
2019 disestablishments in North Carolina